Milenko Đedović (born 28 February 1972) is a Serbian former footballer who played as a midfielder.

Career
After starting out at Vrbas, Đedović moved to Hajduk Kula in 1993. He spent two seasons with the club, playing in the First League of FR Yugoslavia, before transferring to Partizan in 1995. Six months later, Đedović returned to Hajduk Kula.

In 1999, Đedović had a brief spell at VfB Leipzig in Germany's Regionalliga. He later played for Borac Čačak and Zemun, before moving abroad for the second time in 2001. During the 2004 winter transfer window, Đedović moved back to his homeland and rejoined Zemun. He retired from the game in 2009.

References

External links
 
 

1. FC Lokomotive Leipzig players
Association football midfielders
Cypriot First Division players
Expatriate footballers in Cyprus
Expatriate footballers in Germany
First League of Serbia and Montenegro players
FK Borac Čačak players
FK ČSK Čelarevo players
FK Hajduk Kula players
FK Partizan players
FK Vrbas players
FK Zemun players
Olympiakos Nicosia players
Regionalliga players
Serbia and Montenegro expatriate footballers
Serbia and Montenegro expatriate sportspeople in Cyprus
Serbia and Montenegro expatriate sportspeople in Germany
Serbia and Montenegro footballers
Serbian footballers
Yugoslav footballers
1972 births
Living people